The Blue Album or Blue album may refer to:
 The Blue Album (Valensia album), 2002 rock album by Valensia
 Blue Album (Orbital album), 2004 electronica album
 Blue (Diana Ross album), 2006 a soul/jazz album
 Blue (Joni Mitchell album), 1971 album by singer-songwriter Joni Mitchell
 Blue (Third Eye Blind album), 1999 rock album
 The Blue (album), 2007 metal album by Novembre
 Lukas Graham (Blue Album), 2015 album by the band Lukas Graham
 Sinii Albom (English: The Blue Album), 1981 rock album by Aquarium
 The Blue Album, 2000 demo album by the All-American Rejects
 The Blue Album, 2007 parody album by Black Lace
 The Blue Album, 2010 album by Mr. Capone-E
 Adolescents (album), 1981 punk album by the Adolescents
 Weezer (Blue Album), 1994 album by Weezer
 1967–1970, a 1973 compilation of songs by the Beatles
 311 (album), 1995 alternative rock album by 311
 One, a 2012 album by C418

See also 
 The Blue EP (disambiguation)
 The White Album (disambiguation)
 Blue (disambiguation)